The Diocese of Portland is an ecclesiastical territory, or diocese, of the Catholic Church for the entire state of Maine in the United States. It is led by a bishop, and its cathedral, or mother church, is the Cathedral of the Immaculate Conception in Portland, Maine. Robert Deeley was installed as bishop in 2014.

History

1700 to 1875 
Before the American Revolution, the British Province of Massachusetts Bay, which included Maine, had enacted laws prohibiting the practice of Catholicism in the colony. It was even illegal for a priest to reside there. To gain the support of Catholics for the Revolution, colonial leaders were forced to make concessions.  Massachusetts enacted religious freedom for Catholics in 1780.Pope Pius VII erected the Diocese of Boston on April 8, 1808, including all of New England in its jurisdiction. 

On July 29, 1853, Pope Pius IX erected the Diocese of Portland.  He took New Hampshire and Maine from the Diocese of Boston to create the new diocese, making it a suffragan of the Archdiocese of New York. The pope appointed Reverend David  Bacon of the Archdiocese of New York as the first bishop of Portland. At the beginning of Bacon's tenure, the diocese held only six priests and eight churches. When he died in 1874, it contained 63 churches, 52 priests, 23 parish schools, and a Catholic population of about 80,000.

1875 to 1900 
On February 12, 1875, Pope Pius IX elevated the Diocese of Boston to the Archdiocese of Boston. He moved the Diocese of Portland from the Archdiocese of New York to the new archdiocese.That same month, the pope appointed Reverend James Healy from the Diocese of Boston as the new bishop.  Healy was the first African-American Catholic bishop in the United States, although he kept his background a secret.  Healy supervised the setup of the new Diocese of Manchester.

Early into his tenure as bishop, Healy became involved in a conflict with one of his priests, Reverend Jean Ponsardin of Biddeford, Maine. Healy suspected that Ponsardin had been stealing money that the diocese gave him to build a new church.  After four years of construction, the building only had a basement and unfinished exterior walls. Healy refused to give Ponsardin any more money and suspended him from ministry in October 1877. Ponsardin then appealed his suspension to the Vatican, which created gossip among officials there. Healy finally agreed to pay Ponsardin's debts on the condition that he leave the diocese. 

The Ponsardin matter caused such embarrassment for Healy that he submitted his resignation to Leo XIII in 1878, but the pope rejected it.On April 15, 1884, Pope Leo XIII erected the Diocese of Manchester and removed New Hampshire from the Diocese of Portland.  This action reduced the diocese to its current territory, the State of Maine. By the time Healy died in 1900, the diocese had 92 priests, 86 churches, and 96,400 Catholics.

1900 to 1925 
Leo XIII appointed Reverend William O'Connell in 1901 as the new bishop of Portland. After five years as bishop there, he was appointed coadjutor archbishop of the Archdiocese of Boston. To replace him, Pope PIus X in 1906 appointed Reverend Louis  Walsh from the Archdiocese of Boston. During his tenure as bishop, Walsh established several new parishes and schools, and renovated the cathedral. His tenure was also marked by a wave of immigrants from Poland, Italy, Slovakia, and Lithuania. He met vocal opposition from groups of French Canadian parishioners over the ownership of parish property, leading Walsh to place six of their leaders under interdict.

Walsh's last years as bishop of Portland saw the rise of the Ku Klux Klan as a political force in Maine, particularly in Portland.  The diocese's expanding parochial school system became a Klan rallying point.  Walsh personally led the fight against the Barwise Bill, a Klan-supported measure in the Maine Legislature that would have prevented the state government from providing the Catholic Church with funds for any purpose.  The measure, and two similar bills by State Senators Owen Brewster and Benedict Maher were defeated, the last in a statewide referendum. Walsh died in 1924.

1925 to 1950 
Auxiliary Bishop John Murray of the Archdiocese of Hartford was appointed by Pope Pius XI in 1925 as bishop of Portland. On September 26. 1928, the pope renamed the Diocese of Portland as the Diocese of Portland in Maine.  This action was to avoid confusion with the newly erected Archdiocese of Portland in Portland, Oregon.

During his five-year tenure in Portland, Murray established thirty new parishes and a diocesan weekly newspaper, Church World, in 1930. During the Great Depression, Murray organized relief committees to raise money for the homeless and unemployed families. He was forced to mortgage church property to continue funding hospitals, orphanages, and other institutions. Consequently, the diocese accumulated millions of dollars in debt. Murray was appointed archbishop of the Archdiocese of St. Paul in 1932.

Murray's replacement as bishop was Reverend Joseph McCarthy of the Archdiocese of Hartford, named by Pius XI in 1932.  McCarthy used his power as a corporation sole to alleviate the debt accumulated by Murray by offering the diocesan property holdings as security for a successful bond issue. By 1936, he had stabilized the diocesan financial situation.

In 1938, McCarthy purchased the former Portland home of railroad executive Morris McDonald as his official residence. He opened numerous elementary schools, high schools, and colleges during his tenure. McCarthy received Reverend Daniel Feeney as an auxiliary bishop in 1946, delegating most administration tasks to him due to his own declining health.

1950 to present 
In 1952, Pope Pius XII appointed Feeney as coadjutor bishop of the diocese.  When McCarthy died in 1955, Feeney automatically became the new bishop of Portland.

Feeney opened new rectories, convents, schools, social centers, parish halls, and the diocesan chancery. In what he described as his greatest accomplishment, Feeney eliminated the diocesan debt burden dating back to the 1930's. In 1967, Reverend Peter Leo Gerety from the Archdiocese of Hartford was appointed by Pope Paul VI as coadjutor bishop of Portland to assist Feeney.  When Feeney died in 1969, Gerety automatically succeeded him as bishop of Portland.

As bishop, Gerety implemented the liturgical reforms of the Second Vatican Council by modernizing the Cathedral of the Immaculate Conception, through the removal of the high altar, cathedra, pulpit, and communion rail. He also provided housing for the elderly and expanded the fiocesan Bureau of Human Relations. In 1970, Paul VI appointed Reverend Edward O'Leary as auxiliary bishop in Portland.  When Gerety left Portland in 1974 to become archbishop of the Archdiocese of Newark, the pope appointed O'Leary as Gerety's replacement.

During his tenure, O'Leary addressed the problem of an increasing Catholic population in the diocese with a decline in the number of priests. He encouraged the greater involvement of laity and women in church administration, and developed a system of parish councils. The diocese also joined the Maine Council of Churches during this time. Pope John Paul II appointed Revered Joseph Gerry as auxiliary bishop of the diocese in 1986.  After O'Leary resigned as bishop in 1988, the pope appointed Gerry as his replacement.

Gerry consolidated Maine parishes in Old Town, Lisbon, and Waterville and opened St. Dominic Regional High School in Auburn, Maine, in 2002.On March 9, 2002 Gerry removed two priests from ministry in the diocese.  The two men, Michael Doucette and John Audibert, had admitted to sexually abusing different boys during the 1980s.  Gerry said that the men would not be transferred to other parishes.

After Gerry's retirement in 2004, Pope Benedict XVI appointed Auxiliary Bishop Richard. J. Malone from the Archdiocese of Boston as the new bishop. On May 29, 2012, Benedict XVI named Malone as bishop of the Diocese of Buffalo.  On December 18, 2013, Pope Francis named Auxiliary Bishop Robert Deeley of the Archdiocese of Boston, as Malone's successor in Portland.  He was installed in a Mass at the Cathedral of the Immaculate Conception on February 14, 2014.  Deeley is the current bishop of the Diocese of Portland.

Sexual abuse
In 1998, nine male former students at the Jesuit-run Cheverus High School in Portland sued the Diocese of Portland, stating that they had been molested by Reverend James Talbot, a teacher, and Charles Malia, a coach. Talbot admitted his guilt and was fired. Malia retired in 1998, but did not admit his guilt until 2000. The plaintiffs accused both Cheverus and the diocese of hiding information about the abusers, and said that both parties knew about previous accusations against Talbot.  Prior to working in Portland, Talbot had been employed at the Boston College High School in Boston.  After receiving accusations of sexual abuse against him in Boston, the Jesuit Order had transferred Talbot to Cheverus.  On September 24, 2018, Talbot pled guilty to the sex abuse charges in Maine and immediately began serving two concurrent three-year prison sentences. Due to the statute of limitations in Maine, Malia could not be prosecuted for any of his crimes.

By the time Talbot was implicated in the Archdiocese of Boston's Spotlight scandal in 2002, the amount of settlements which the Diocese of Portland had given to Cheverus victims had reached a cumulative seven figures, with additional counseling still ongoing. In 2016, the Diocese of Portland settled six additional lawsuits for sexual abuse not related to Cheverus for an estimated $1.2 million. By January 2019, the Society of Jesus' Northeast Province in the United States had acknowledged seven accused Jesuit clergy had taught at Cheverus. In August 2019, Bishop Deeley launched an abuse reporting system for the Diocese of Portland. 

Ronald Paquin, a laicized Boston priest who served time for the Spotlight abuses, received a 16-year prison sentence in May 2019 after being convicted in November 2018 of 11 counts of sexual abuse he inflicted on an altar boy during trips to Maine in the 1980s. On April 23, 2020, the Maine Supreme Judicial Court upheld 10 of Paquin's 11 convictions, with one charge being vacated. It was also ruled that two of the 10 charges which were upheld also accounted for two other charges he was convicted of as well, thus making them offset.

Bishops

Bishops of Portland (in Maine)
 David William Bacon (1855–1874)
 James Augustine Healy (1875–1900)
 William Henry O'Connell (1901–1906), appointed Coadjutor Archbishop and later Archbishop of Boston (elevated to Cardinal in 1911)
 Louis Sebastian Walsh (1906–1924)
 John Gregory Murray (1925–1931), appointed Archbishop of Saint Paul
 Joseph Edward McCarthy (1932–1955)
 Daniel Joseph Feeney (1955–1969)
 Peter Leo Gerety (1969–1974), appointed Archbishop of Newark
 Edward Cornelius O'Leary (1974–1988)
 Joseph John Gerry, O.S.B. (1988–2004)
 Richard Joseph Malone (2004–2012), appointed Bishop of Buffalo
 Robert Deeley (2014–present)

Auxiliary bishops
Daniel Joseph Feeney (1946–1955), appointed Bishop of Portland
Edward Cornelius O'Leary (1970–1974), appointed Bishop of Portland
Amédée Wilfrid Proulx (1975–1993)
Michael Richard Cote (1995–2003), appointed Bishop of Norwich

Other priests of this diocese who became Bishop
 Denis Mary Bradley, appointed Bishop of Manchester in 1884

Parishes

The Diocese is currently divided into 30 Clusters/Parishes.

Notable churches

Cathedral 

The Diocese's cathedral is the Cathedral of the Immaculate Conception in Portland.

Basilica

The Basilica of Saints Peter and Paul is located in Lewiston. The parish traces its roots to 1872 and grew due to a wave of late 19th century immigration by French Canadians.  Construction of the current church began  in 1906 and continued until 1936, by which time it was the second largest church in New England. Construction languished because the diocese split the parish in 1905 and 1923 and the new congregations took a portion of the parish treasury to establish and construct their own churches.  In 1983, the church was added to the National Register of Historic Places. In 2004, Pope Benedict XVI named the church a minor basilica.

Historic places
St. John The Evangelist Catholic Church is located in Bangor, Maine. John Bapst oversaw construction of the church beginning in 1855, and in 1973 it was added to the National Register of Historic Places.

Education

High schools
 Cheverus High School, Portland
 Saint Dominic Academy, Auburn

Public affairs

On January 6, 2000, the Associated Press reported that the Diocese of Portland had negotiated with and supported a Maine lawmakers' bill that barred discrimination on the basis of sexual orientation; this bill aimed to overcome the results of the Maine election in February 1998 that repealed the gay marriage law that Maine Governor Angus King signed into law. The Diocese did not have a position on the February 1998 vote, citing ambiguities in the law while acknowledging discrimination as unjust.

In November 2009 it was reported that the Diocese of Portland had contributed $550,000, or 20% of the total cash contributed to Stand For Marriage Maine, a successful campaign to prevent then-impending legalization of same-sex marriage in Maine. Roughly 55% of the funds donated by the Diocese came from other out-of-state dioceses who donated money to the Diocese of Portland's PAC.

Ecclesiastical province
See: List of Catholic bishops of the United States#Province of Boston

See also

 Catholic Church by country
 Catholic Church in the United States
 Ecclesiastical Province of Boston
 Global organisation of the Catholic Church
 List of Roman Catholic archdioceses (by country and continent)
 List of Roman Catholic dioceses (alphabetical) (including archdioceses)
 List of Roman Catholic dioceses (structured view) (including archdioceses)
 List of the Catholic dioceses of the United States

References

External links

Catholic Hierarchy Profile of the Diocese of Portland

 
Portland
Portland
1853 establishments in Maine
Catholic Church in Maine
Portland